Saulė is a solar goddess, the common Baltic solar deity in the Lithuanian and Latvian mythologies. The noun Saulė/Saule in the Lithuanian and Latvian languages is also the conventional name for the Sun and originates from the Proto-Baltic name *Sauliā > *Saulē.

Representation
Saulė is one of the most powerful deities, the goddess of the sun itself, responsible for all life on Earth. She is the patroness of the unfortunate, especially orphans. The Lithuanian and Latvian words for "the world" (pasaulis and pasaule) are translated as "[a place] under the Sun".

Saulė is mentioned in one of the earliest written sources on Lithuanian mythology. According to the Slavic translation of the Chronicle by John Malalas (1261), a smith named Teliavelis made the Sun and threw it into the sky. Missionary Jerome of Prague (ca. 1369–1440) spent three years attempting to Christianize Lithuania and later recounted a myth about the kidnapped Saulė. She was held in a tower by a powerful king and rescued by the zodiac using a giant sledgehammer. Jerome swore that he personally witnessed the hammer, venerated by the locals.

Family

Saulė and Mėnuo/Mēness (the Moon) were wife and husband. Mėnuo fell in love with Aušrinė (the morning star or Venus). For his infidelity, Perkūnas (thunder god) punished Mėnuo. There are different accounts of the punishment. One version has it that Mėnuo was cut into two pieces, but he did not learn from his mistakes and thus the punishment is repeated every month. Another version claims that Mėnuo and Saulė divorced, but both wanted to see their daughter Žemyna (earth). That is why the Sun shines during the day, while the Moon visits at night. A third version claims that the face of Mėnuo was disfigured by either Dievas (the supreme god) or Saulė.

In other myths, Aušrinė is depicted as a daughter and servant of Saulė. Aušrinė lights the fire for Saulė and makes her ready for another day's journey across the sky. Vakarinė (the evening star) makes the bed for Saulė in the evening. In the Lithuanian mythology, Saulė was mother of other planets: Indraja (Jupiter), Sėlija (Saturn), Žiezdrė (Mars), Vaivora (Mercury).

Feasts
Saulė's feast was celebrated during the summer solstice. Lithuanian Rasos (turned into Saint Jonas' Festival by Christianity) and Latvian Līgo (turned into Jāņi) involve making wreaths, looking for the magical fern flower, burning bonfires, dancing around and leaping over the fire, and greeting the Sun when it rises at around 4 am next morning. It is the most joyous traditional holiday. The winter solstice is celebrated as the return of Saulė. Christianity absorbed Lithuanian Kūčios and Latvian Ziemassvētki into Christmas. Other celebrations took place around the equinoxes.

Mythology

Colors 
In Latvian folk songs, Saule and her daughter(s) are dressed of shawls woven with gold thread and Saule wears shoes of gold. She is also depicted in a silver, gold or silk costume and wearing a sparkling crown.

She is sometimes portrayed as waking up "red" (sārta) or "in a red tree" during the morning. Saule is also said to own golden tools and garments: slippers, scarf, belt, and a golden boat she uses as her means of transportation. Other accounts ascribe her golden rings, golden ribbons, golden tassels, and even a golden crown.

Saule is also described as being dressed in clothes woven with "threads of red, gold, silver and white". In the Lithuanian tradition, the sun is also described as a "golden wheel" or a "golden circle" that rolls down the mountain at sunset. Also in Latvian riddles and songs, Saule is associated with the color red as if to indicate the "fiery aspect" of the sun: the setting and the rising sun are equated with a rose wreath and a rose in bloom due to their circular shapes.

Movements 
Saulė is portrayed dancing in her gilded shoes on a silver hill and her fellow Baltic goddess Aušrinė is said to dance on a stone for the people on the first day of summer. In Lithuania, the Sun (identified as female) rides a car towards her husband, the Moon, "dancing and emitting fiery sparks" on the way.

Dwelling 
In a myth from Lithuania, a man named Joseph becomes fascinated with Aušrinė appearing in the sky and goes on a quest to find the "second sun", who is actually a maiden that lives on an island in the sea and has the same hair like the Sun. In the Baltic folklore, Saulė is said to live in a silver gated castle at the end of the sea, located somewhere in the east, or to go to an island in the middle of the sea for her nocturnal rest. In folksongs, Saule sinks into the bottom of a lake to sleep at night, in a silver cradle "in the white seafoam".

Vehicle 
Saulė also drives a carriage with copper wheels, a "gleaming copper chariot" or a golden chariot pulled by untiring horses or a "pretty little sleigh" (kamaņiņa) made of fish-bones. Saulė is also described as driving her shining car on the way to her husband, the Moon. In other accounts, she is said to sail the seas on a silver or a golden boat, which, according to legend, is what her chariot transforms into for her night travels. In a Latvian folksong, Saule hangs her sparkling crown on a tree in the evening and enters a golden boat to sail away.

Horses 
Saulė's horses are also mentioned in several pieces of Baltic folklore. Her horses are said to be of white color; in other accounts they amount to three steeds of golden, silver and diamond colors. In Latvian dainas (folk songs), her horses are described as yellow, of a golden or a fiery color. The sun's steeds are also portrayed as having hooves and bridles of gold in the dainas, and as golden beings themselves or of a bay colour, "reflect[ing] the hues of the bright or the twilight sky". When she begins her nocturnal journey through the World Sea, her chariot changes into a boat and "the Sun swims her horses", which signifies that "she stops to wash her horses in the sea".

Scholarship points that the expressions geltoni žirgeliai or dzelteni kumeliņi ('golden' or 'yellow horses'), which appear in Latvian dainas, seem to be a recurrent poetic motif.

Other depictions
According to studies by professor Vaira Vīķe-Freiberga and ethnologue , Saule is also depicted in folksongs as a "mother" (Lithuanian motinėlė, Latvian māmuliņa) who comforts orphans, which is the reason why the sun takes time to rise. In other folksongs, the personified female Sun is also associated with the color "white" (Latv balt-), such as the imagery of a white shirt, the expression "mīļā, balte" ("Sun, dear, white"), and the description of the trajectory of the sun (red as it rises, white as it journeys on its way).

See also

 List of solar deities
 Proto-Indo-European mythology
 Indo-European cosmogony
 Baltic mythology
 Lithuanian mythology
 Prussian mythology
 Latvian mythology

Footnotes

References

Bibliography

Further reading
 
 
 
 

Baltic goddesses
Childhood goddesses
Latvian goddesses
Lithuanian goddesses
Solar goddesses